Artem Prokofiev (born 31 December 1983, Kazan) is a Russian political figure and a deputy of the 8th State Duma.
 
From 2002 to 2004, Prokofiev worked as deputy chairman of the political club of students of Tatarstan under the league of students of the Republic of Tatarstan. From 2007 to 2009, he was an assistant to the deputy of the State Duma Oleg Kulikov. From 2009 to 2021, he was the deputy of the State Council of the Republic of Tatarstan of the 4th, 5th, and 6th convocations. From 2011 to 2014, he was an assistant to the deputy of the State Duma Viktor Peshkov. Since September 2021, he has served as deputy of the 8th State Duma.

References
 

 

1983 births
Living people
Communist Party of the Russian Federation members
21st-century Russian politicians
Eighth convocation members of the State Duma (Russian Federation)
Politicians from Kazan